Goldman School may refer to:
Goldman School of Dental Medicine, the dental school of Boston University
Goldman School of Public Policy, a public policy school at the University of California, Berkeley